Kaleh Namak Kur (also Romanized as Kaleh Namak Kūr) is a village in Sedeh Rural District, in the Central District of Arak County, Markazi Province, Iran. At the 2006 census, its population was 381, in 113 families.

References 

Populated places in Arak County